Marc Crépon  (born 30 March 1962) is a French philosopher and academic who writes on the subject of languages and communities in the French and German philosophies and contemporary political and moral philosophy. He has also translated works by philosophers such as Nietzsche, Franz Rosenzweig and Leibniz.

He is Professor of Philosophy at the Ecole Normale Superieure and director of research at the Archives Husserl, National Center for Scientific Research.

Early life 
He was born in Decize, Nievre in 1962. After high school, Crépon completed a preparatory course at Lycee Condorcet in Paris. He then attended the Ecole Normale Superieure and passed the agrégation in 1986, a French civil service exam for positions in public education.

The topic of his dissertation (written in French) was The problem of human diversity: survey on the characterization of the people and the constitution of geographies of spirit from Leibniz to Hegel (1995).

Career 
Crépon's first academic position was teaching philosophy at Nanterre University. Shortly after this, he moved to Moldova for a period and credits living and working in the USSR with developing many of his attitudes and pedagogical methods. At this time, he also developed an interest in the relationship between political and linguistic communities, which he would go on to research in greater detail.

He has traveled and lectured at American universities, including University of California, Irvine and Rice University. Crépon also taught classes while in residence at Northwestern University in Chicago in 2006 and in 2008.

Marc Crépon was the co-founder (along with Bernard Stiegler) of the association Ars Industrialis.

Publications 

Marc Crépon has written 16 books in French, the most notable of which are listed below.
 
 Le malin génie des langues : Nietzsche, Heidegger, Rosenzweig. Title trans: The Evil Genius of Language: Nietzsche, Heidegger, Rosenzweig. Paris : Vrin, 2000. . OCLC 876603414. 
 Les promesses du langage : Benjamin, Rosenzweig, Heidegger. Title trans: The promises of language: Benjamin, Rosenzweig, Heidegger. Paris : J. Vrin, 2001. . OCLC 876603462.
 De la democratie participative : fondements et limites (with Bernard Stiegler). Title trans: Participatory Democracy: Foundations and limits. [Paris] : Mille et une nuits, [2007]. . OCLC 876604004.
 Derrida, la tradition de la philosophie (with Frédéric Worms). Title trans: Derrida, the tradition of the philosophy. Paris : Galilée, impr. 2008. . OCLC 494480595.
 The thought of death and the memory of war (with Michael Maurice Loriaux). Minneapolis, MN : University of Minnesota Press, 2013. . OCLC 840465545.
 The death penalty. Chicago ; London : University of Chicago Press, 2014-. . OCLC 865494962.

References 

Living people
French historians of philosophy
French National Centre for Scientific Research scientists
1962 births